The Clatsop is a small tribe of Chinookan-speaking Native Americans in the Pacific Northwest of the United States. In the early 19th century they inhabited an area of the northwestern coast of present-day Oregon from the mouth of the Columbia River south to Tillamook Head, Oregon.

Language
Clatsop in the original language is łät'cαp, which means "place of dried salmon". Clatsop was originally the name of a single settlement, later applied to the tribe as a whole.

The Clatsop dialect used by the tribe is an extinct dialect of the Lower Chinookan language. Most Clatsops spoke Chinook Jargon  by the time Lewis and Clark's Corps of Discovery made contact with them.  Some spoke Nehalem, reflecting intermarriage and cohabitation with that tribe.

Chinook Jargon is a trade language and was once used throughout much of the Pacific Northwest. Many place names in the area come from the Chinook Jargon, for example, Ecola Creek and Park — "whale".

History
The tribe is first reported in the 1792 journals of Robert Gray. Members were encountered at the mouth of Columbia in 1805 by the Lewis and Clark Expedition. Clatsop County, Oregon was named after this tribe. According to the journals of William Clark, the Clatsop comprised about 200 people living in three separate villages, with large longhouses constructed of cedar planks. Clatsop members regularly visited the fort to trade furs and other goods for European manufactured goods. for trading purposes.

The tribe had designated headmen (or "chiefs") but was socially flexible. Individual families affiliated with one another in small villages and seasonal camps located near food sources.

The Clatsop shared salmon, berries, and hunting tips with the Corps of Discovery. In contrast to the Corps' interactions with the Plains Indians the previous winter, their interaction with the Clatsop was more limited. The two groups did not mingle for social occasions, and the fort was opened to trading only 24 days during the winter. Part of the reason may have been that the coastal tribes had an existing relationship with British traders. The Clatsop and Chinook asked for higher prices from the American expedition for their goods at a time when the Corps' supply of "Indian gifts" had dwindled. Only two Clatsop, Coboway and Cuscalar, are regularly named in the Corps members' journals.

In an 1851 treaty, the Clatsop tribe proposed to cede 90 percent of their land to the U.S. Government. This treaty was one of many in the Northwest that was never ratified by Senate. Unlike other tribes, the members were not required to move to a reservation. They were one of the only tribes in Oregon that were not the focus of an organized effort to remove them from reservations.

The last known speaker of the Tillamook language died in 1972. Individual Clatsop-Nehalem applied for membership with both the Confederated Tribes of Siletz and Confederated Tribes of Grand Ronde but were turned down. 

In January 2001, the Chinook tribe (in which the Clatsop were included) gained official federal recognition through an executive order by President Clinton. This restoration of federal status as a tribe excluded Clatsop members of the Chinook rolls. The Chinook's legal status was reversed by the Bush administration soon after taking office. The bicentennial of the Lewis and Clark Expedition in 2004–2006 provided renewed interest in the status of the Clatsop and Chinook.

The Clatsop have no formal recognition today and have struggled in recent years to retain their communal identity. Some of the remaining approximately 200 members now form an unofficial confederation, the Clatsop-Nehalem Confederated Tribes of Oregon, allying with the Salishan-speaking Nehalem (Tillamook) tribe that once inhabited the area around Tillamook Bay. Many Clatsop also remains enrolled with the (unrecognized) Chinook Tribe. Other tribes in the region, such as the Quinault, Siletz, and Grand Ronde, also have several enrollees of Clatsop descent. Clatsop descendants continue to maintain their culture and ceremonies as family and small community units, as in the past.

In May 2020, the North Coast Land Conservancy transferred  of its Neawanna Point Habitat Preserve, located on the north Oregon coast, to the Clatsop-Nehalem Confederated Tribes. The area, located between Seaside and Gearhart, Oregon, consists of saltmarsh and Sitka spruce forest on the Necanicum Estuary at the north end of Seaside. The Neawanna and the Neacoxie creeks meet the Necanicum River, which flows to the Pacific. Ancestors of the current tribal members had lived here long before the arrival of Europeans, but the people were later displaced. The Clatsop had known this area by the name Ne-ah-coxie, or "place of little pines". This is the first land owned by the tribes since they were displaced by European Americans beginning nearly 200 years ago.

Museum exhibits
The Tillamook County Pioneer Museum in Tillamook contains exhibits on the history of the Clatsop.

See also

 Tsin-is-tum

Footnotes

External links
Clatsop-Nehalem Confederated Tribes of Oregon
University of Missouri-St. Louis: Clatsop tribe

Chinookan tribes
Confederated Tribes of Siletz Indians
Indigenous peoples of the Northwest Plateau
Native American tribes in Oregon
Oregon Coast
[[Category:Terminated Native American tribes]